Adjutant Lahai Gbabye Lansanah is a Liberian politician and former military officer. Lansanah is a member of the National Democratic Party of Liberia. Lansanah was elected to the Senate of Liberia in the 2005 general election as Senior Senator from the Bomi County. He is one of two senators from the NDPL and was the Chairman of the Senate Committee on National Defense. 2008–2009 Lansanah served as Acting President Pro Tempore of the Senate of Liberia. By 2009, Senator John Ballout of Maryland became Chairman of the Defense Committee.

Military career
Prior to joining the Senate, Lansanah served as adjutant to former commanding general of the Armed Forces of Liberia, Brigadier John Tarnue.

References

Year of birth missing (living people)
Living people
People from Bomi County
Liberian military personnel
Members of the Senate of Liberia
Presidents pro tempore of the Senate of Liberia
National Democratic Party of Liberia politicians
21st-century Liberian politicians